WHFW is a Catholic Religious formatted broadcast radio station licensed to Winchester, Virginia, serving the City of Winchester, along with Eastern Frederick County and Western Clarke County in Virginia.  WHFW is owned and operated by Christendom College.

Station sold
On December 2, 2014, Holy Family Communications began the process to sell WHFW to Christendom College, owner of WXDM, for $1,000.  The sale of the station was closed on January 16, 2015.

References

External links
 Radio Christendom Online
 

2013 establishments in Virginia
Catholic radio stations
Radio stations established in 2013
HFW
Christendom College
College radio stations in Virginia
Winchester, Virginia